Senator Cropsey may refer to:

Alan Cropsey (born 1952), Michigan State Senate
Harman B. Cropsey (died 1859), New York State Senate
Harmon G. Cropsey (1917–2009), Michigan State Senate